Year 1251 (MCCLI) was a common year starting on Sunday (link will display the full calendar) of the Julian calendar.

Events 
 By place 
 Europe 
 April – The first Shepherds' Crusade, a domestic French uprising in response to events in Egypt during the Seventh Crusade, occurs.
 May – English governor Simon de Montfort suppresses a revolt in Gascony.
 December 26 – King Alexander III of Scotland marries Margaret, daughter of King Henry III of England, precipitating a power struggle between the two monarchs.
 Andrew de Longjumeau, dispatched two years earlier by King Louis IX of France as an ambassador to the Mongols, meets the king in Palestine, with reports from the Mongols and Tartary; his mission is considered a failure.
 Mindaugas of Lithuania is baptized, in prelude to his crowning as King of Lithuania in 1253.
 Alexander Nevsky signs the first peace treaty between Kievan Rus' and Norway.
 King Conrad IV of Germany invades Italy, but fails to subdue the supporters of Pope Innocent IV.
 The German city of Berlin, founded some 50 years earlier, receives its city charter.
 Ottokar II of Bohemia, later to become King of Bohemia, is elected Duke of Austria.
 The earliest known manuscript of The Proverbs of Alfred, a collection of sayings of England's Alfred the Great, is written.

 Asia 
 April 21 – City of Launggyet in Arakan (modern-day Burma) is founded according to some sources.
 July 1 – Möngke Khan is elected as the fourth great Khan of the Mongol Empire.
 The carving of the Tripitaka Koreana, a collection of Buddhist scriptures recorded on some 81,000 wooden blocks, is completed.

Births 
 June 5 – Hōjō Tokimune, 8th regent of the Kamakura shogunate (d. 1284)
 September 2 – Francis of Fabriano, Italian writer (d. 1322)
 November 1 – Leopold III, Duke of Austria (d. 1386)
 Adelaide, Countess of Auxerre, French countess (d. 1290)

Deaths 
 January – Bohemund V of Antioch
 January 25 – Princess Rishi, Empress consort of Japan (b. 1197)
 February 9  – Matthias II, Duke of Lorraine
 March 6 – Rose of Viterbo, Italian saint (b. 1235)
 March 31 – William of Modena, Bishop of Modena
 June 6 – William III of Dampierre, Count of Flanders
 September 7 – Viola, Duchess of Opole, Bulgarian consort
 date unknown 
Winter 1251–52 – Eljigidei, Mongol commander of Persia, killed
Isobel of Huntingdon, Scots noblewoman (b. 1199)
Oghul Qaimish, 3rd regent of the Mongol Empire, following her husband's death

References